Negussie (also Negusse, Negusie or Nigussie), meaning "King of", is a name of Ethiopian origin that may refer to:

Hailu Negussie (born 1978), Ethiopian marathon runner and 2005 Boston Marathon winner
Abebech Negussie (born 1983), Ethiopian middle-distance runner
Andualem Negusse (born 1985), Ethiopian footballer
Yetnebersh Nigussie (born 1982), Ethiopian lawyer and disability rights activist

See also
Negusie v. Holder, 2009 legal case at the United States Supreme Court regarding asylum

Amharic-language names